Maximilian Wolfram (born 21 February 1997) is a German footballer who plays as a winger for SC Verl.

Career
On 31 May 2019 FC Ingolstadt 04 confirmed, that they had signed Wolfram on a 3-year contract.

References

External links
 

1997 births
Living people
People from Zwickau
German footballers
Association football midfielders
FC Carl Zeiss Jena players
FC Ingolstadt 04 players
FSV Zwickau players
SC Verl players
Regionalliga players
3. Liga players
Footballers from Saxony